Mary is an American sitcom television series that aired on CBS from December 11, 1985, to April 8, 1986. The series stars Mary Tyler Moore in her return to series television after an absence of over six years, during which time she appeared on Broadway in Whose Life Is It Anyway? and in the dramatic film Ordinary People.  After The Mary Tyler Moore Show, her subsequent ventures into series television on the variety shows Mary (1978) and The Mary Tyler Moore Hour (1979) had been short-running ratings disasters, and Moore decided to return to the sitcom format which had brought her the greatest television success; the sitcom nonetheless met the same fate as the variety shows.

Synopsis
In Mary, Moore plays Mary Brenner, a 40-ish divorcée working at a second rate tabloid, the Chicago Eagle. She was formerly a high-profile writer at a fashion magazine named Women's Digest, which recently went out of business, and she is now reduced to writing a consumer-assistance column, "Helpline", helping to expose substandard business practices and products and the often uncaring reaction of government to these problems.  Her boss, Managing Editor Frank DeMarco (James Farentino), concentrates on sensationalism as he is convinced that that is what really sells papers.  He is also quite a ladies' man, and is attracted to Mary, as she is to him, but she finds dealing with that situation to be quite awkward.

Also working at the Eagle are the cynical, chain-smoking columnist Jo Tucker (Katey Sagal), the condescending theater critic Ed LaSalle (John Astin), and Tully (David Byrd), a copy editor who can scarcely function because he is going blind but knows he isn't going away; his job has strong protection from the union.  Neighbors include Susan Wilcox (Carlene Watkins), Mary's good friend, whose fiancé Lester Mintz (James Tolkan) seems to be somehow "connected".

Change of name
The newspaper was originally called Chicago Post. Chicago alderman Richard Mell, who owned a newspaper by that name, asked that the name be changed because "The Chicago Post is not a sleazy newspaper." The producers changed the name before airing.

Airing
Throughout its run, Mary was paired with the sitcom Foley Square starring Margaret Colin, which also premiered on December 11, 1985, and aired at 8:30 p.m. on Wednesdays immediately after Mary at 8:00 p.m. Neither show ever really found much of an audience, and after Marys tenth episode aired on February 19, 1986, Mary went into hiatus, as did Foley Square after its eleventh episode was broadcast on February 26, 1986. Still paired, the two shows moved to Tuesdays and a later time slot in the hope of boosting their ratings. Broadcasts of both shows at the new day and time resumed on March 25, 1986, with Mary at 9:00 p.m. and Foley Square at 9:30 p.m. On Mary, Susan and Lester were written out and Marys personal life was generally downplayed in favor of her business one.  There were some favorable reviews, although some critics pronounced it as more or less a clone of her previous sitcom The Mary Tyler Moore Show. With the two shows still suffering from poor ratings in their new time slots, CBS broadcast only three more episodes of each before cancelling both of them after the thirteenth episode of Mary and fourteenth episode of Foley Square aired on April 8, 1986.

Cast
 Mary Tyler Moore as Mary Brenner
 John Astin as Ed LaSalle
 David Byrd as Vincent Tully
 James Farentino as Frank DeMarco
 Derek McGrath as Ronnie Dicker
 Katey Sagal as Jo Tucker
 James Tolkan as Lester Mintz
 Carlene Watkins as Susan Wilcox

Episodes

References

External links
 

1985 American television series debuts
1986 American television series endings
1980s American workplace comedy television series
1980s American sitcoms
CBS original programming
English-language television shows
Television series about journalism
Television shows set in Chicago
Television series by MTM Enterprises